Wolf Creek Bridge is a historic metal Pratt truss railroad bridge located near Rocky Gap, Bland County, Virginia, United States. It was built about 1912, by the Phoenix Bridge Company of Phoenixville, Pennsylvania, for the New River, Holston and Western Railroad. It was converted for use as a road bridge in 1946. The bridge was closed in 1987 and became a pedestrian bridge and the focal point of a county recreational park.

The bridge was listed on the National Register of Historic Places in 2011.

See also
List of bridges on the National Register of Historic Places in Virginia

References

Railroad bridges in Virginia
Railroad bridges on the National Register of Historic Places in Virginia
Bridges completed in 1912
Buildings and structures in Bland County, Virginia
National Register of Historic Places in Bland County, Virginia
1912 establishments in Virginia
Road bridges on the National Register of Historic Places in Virginia
Metal bridges in the United States
Pratt truss bridges in the United States